Gabrielle Alina Eugenia Maria Petit (20 February 1893 – 1 April 1916) was a Belgian woman who spied for the British Secret Service during World War I. She was executed in 1916, and became a Belgian national heroine after the war's end.

Life 
Petit was born on 20 February 1893 in Tournai to working-class parents. She was raised in a Catholic boarding school in Brugelette following her mother's early death. At the outbreak of the First World War, she was living in Brussels as a saleswoman. She immediately volunteered to serve with the Belgian Red Cross.

Petit's espionage activities began in 1914, when she helped her wounded soldier fiancé, Maurice Gobert, cross the border to the Netherlands to reunite with his regiment. She passed along to British Intelligence information about the Imperial German army acquired during the trip. The British soon hired her, gave her brief training, and sent her to spy on the enemy. She proceeded to collect information about enemy troop movements using a number of false identities. She was also an active distributor of the clandestine newspaper La Libre Belgique and assisted the underground mail service "Mot du Soldat". She helped several more young men across the Dutch border.

Petit was betrayed by a German who represented himself as Dutch. She was arrested by the German military in February 1916. She was imprisoned at the Prison de Sint-Gillis (a suburb of Brussels), tried, and convicted for espionage, with the death sentence imposed on the following 1 March. During her trial, Petit refused to reveal the identities of her fellow agents, despite offers of amnesty. Among such agents, Germaine Gabrielle Anna Scaron, 23 years of age, daughter of a local magistrate, and a close friend of Mlle Petit, was arrested with her on similar charges, imprisoned but spared and, despite the opposition of German military, released later for lack of sufficient evidence, which Petit had refused to divulge.

On 1 April 1916, Gabrielle Petit was, at the insistence of German military, shot by a firing squad at the Tir national execution field in Schaerbeek. Her body was buried on the grounds there.

Legacy 

Petit's story remained unknown until after the war, when she began to be seen as a martyr for the nation. In May 1919 a state funeral was held for her, attended by Queen Elisabeth of Belgium, Cardinal Mercier of Brussels and Prime Minister Léon Delacroix, after which her remains (and those of fellow agents A. Bodson and A. Smekens) were buried with full military honors at Schaerbeek Cemetery.

A statue of Petit was erected in Brussels and this was said to be the first of a working-class woman. In her native Tournai, a square was named after her. After the war several books were written and films were made about her life. The reference to Germaine Scaron stems from this commentator's family oral history. Scaron was but one of Petit's many acquaintances gathered during the two years of her active life as a British spy and Belgian heroine.

Notes

Further reading

External links
 Gabrielle Petit at First World War.com Accessed March 2009

Belgian spies
1893 births
1916 deaths
Female wartime spies
People from Tournai
Belgian women in World War I
Executed Belgian people
People executed by the German Empire
Executed Belgian women
World War I spies for the United Kingdom
20th-century executions by Germany
Executed spies
Burials at Schaerbeek Cemetery
People executed by Germany by firing squad
Civilians killed in World War I